is a Japanese nonferrous metals manufacturer. The company is a component of the Nikkei 225 stock index.

History
Fujita-gumi, the forerunner of DOWA, was established by three brothers from Yamaguchi prefecture in 1881. The brothers had personal connections with influential members of the government, so in 1884 they bought the Kosaka mine, from which they expanded their business into various fields, centered on the coal mining business. After the purchase, Fujita-gumi increased its capital and invested heavily in skilled labor and equipment. By 1888 the Kosaka mine became Japan's top producer of silver.

In 1900, an engineer at Kosaka succeeded in extracting copper by accessing the kuroko (black ore — a mixture of copper, zinc and lead) deep in the mine. After that, the Kosaka changed its focus from silver to copper, and in 1907 became Japan's largest top producer.

References

External links

 Company website 
  Wiki collection of bibliographic works on Dowa Holdings

Electronics companies of Japan
Engineering companies of Japan
Manufacturing companies based in Tokyo
Mining companies of Japan
Holding companies of Japan
Companies listed on the Tokyo Stock Exchange
Companies listed on the Nagoya Stock Exchange
Companies listed on the Fukuoka Stock Exchange
Manufacturing companies established in 1884
Japanese companies established in 1884
Holding companies established in 1884